The 2000 United States House elections in Pennsylvania was an election for Pennsylvania's delegation to the United States House of Representatives, which occurred as part of the general election of the House of Representatives on November 7, 2000.

General election

1st Congressional district

2nd Congressional District

3rd Congressional district

4th Congressional district
Prior to the 2000 election, Democratic Congressman Ron Klink vacated Pennsylvania's 4th congressional district to challenge Republican Rick Santorum for the United States Senate. Pennsylvania State Senator Melissa Hart won the Republican nomination unopposed. State Representative Terry Van Horne won an 8-way primary election to win the Democratic nomination. Van Horne's victory was He defeated the state and national party's preferred candidate, Matthew Mangino, the Lawrence County, Pennsylvania district attorney. Shortly after Van Horne's victory, the National Republican Congressional Committee began re-circulating 1994 newspaper accounts alleging that he had been overheard using a racial slur in the halls of the Pennsylvania State Capitol to describe fellow State Representative Dwight E. Evans, who was opposing reduction in welfare.

The race was expected to be a close one, with accusations of illegal phone calls, stolen signs, and misleading mailers sent to constituents. Surrogates for both candidates, funded with soft money, aired television advertisements throughout the Western Pennsylvania district. National dignitaries, including Republican Senator John McCain and Democratic Congressman Patrick J. Kennedy of Rhode Island visited the area to advocate for their party's candidates. In the end, Hart won the district with 59% of the vote.

5th Congressional district

6th Congressional district

7th Congressional district

8th Congressional district

9th Congressional district

10th Congressional district

11th Congressional district

12th Congressional district

13th Congressional district

14th Congressional district

15th Congressional district

16th Congressional district

17th Congressional district

18th Congressional district

19th Congressional district

20th Congressional district

21st Congressional district

References

See also
 United States congressional delegations from Pennsylvania
 108th United States Congress

2000 Pennsylvania elections
2000